The Newton Commonwealth Golf Course is an 18-hole public golf course located in Newton, Massachusetts, just outside the city of Boston. This course was originally created as a nine-hole course in 1897 and was previously named the Commonwealth Club. The course expanded into an 18-hole course and was redesigned by influential golf course designer and Newton resident Donald Ross. The course was converted into a public course in the late 1970s when the city of Newton purchased the Chestnut Hill Country Club because of the club's financial instability.

The course is currently managed by Sterling Golf Management Inc., and has a course rating of 67.0 with a slope rating of 125.

References

External links 
 Newton Commonwealth Golf Course
 Sterling Golf
 GolfLink
 Newton Conservators

1897 establishments in Massachusetts
Buildings and structures in Newton, Massachusetts
Golf clubs and courses designed by Donald Ross
Golf clubs and courses in Massachusetts
Sports venues in Middlesex County, Massachusetts
Sports venues completed in 1897